Eratigena arganoi is a species of spider in the genus Eratigena found in Italy.

References

Spiders described in 1971
Spiders of Europe
Agelenidae